The 11th annual Venice International Film Festival was held from 20 August to 10 September 1950.

History

Recognized as the oldest film festival in the world, the Venice Film Festival, made its entry in 1932 in Venice, Italy. Founded by Count Giuseppe Volpi di Misurata, the initial hosting of the festival was done in the Hotel Excelsior in Venice. The participating countries in the 1940s were just a handful owing to the breakout of World War II. The turn-out of participating countries, however, shot up in the 1950s and the festival grew internationally. Even films from Japan and India made their entry in that year. With the introduction of new genre of films, the festival took to newer heights and gained worldwide popularity. The festival helped film directors from all round the world in the betterment of their careers.

Jury 
 Mario Gromo
 Umbro Apollonio
 Antonio Baldini
 Ermanno Contini
 Piero Gadda Conti
 Arturo Lanocita
 Gian Luigi Rondi
 Turi Vasile
 Adone Zecchi

In Competition

Awards
Golden Lion of Saint Mark
 Best Film -  Justice est faite (André Cayatte)
Best Italian Film 
Domani è troppo tardi (Léonide Moguy) 
Volpi Cup
Best Actor - Sam Jaffe (The Asphalt Jungle) 
Best Actress - Eleanor Parker (Caged)
Golden Osella
Best Original Screenplay - Jacques Natanson & Max Ophüls (La Ronde) 
Best Cinematography - Martin Bodin (Bara en mor)
Best Original Music - Brian Easdale (Gone to Earth)
Outstanding Technical Contribution - Jean d'Eaubonne (La Ronde)
International Award
Dieu a besoin des hommes (Jean Delannoy)
Prima comunione (Alessandro Blasetti)
Panic in the Streets (Elia Kazan)
OCIC Award
Dieu a besoin des hommes (Jean Delannoy)
Pasinetti Award
Give Us This Day (Edward Dmytryk)
Special Prize
Cinderella and In Beaver Valley (Walt Disney)

References

External links
 
 Venice Film Festival 1950 Awards on IMDb

1950 film festivals
1950 in Italy
Venice Film Festival
Film
August 1950 events in Europe
September 1950 events in Europe